Chernobyl or Chornobyl is a partially abandoned city in the Chernobyl Exclusion Zone, situated in the Vyshhorod Raion of northern Kyiv Oblast, Ukraine. Before its evacuation, the city had about 14,000 residents (considerably less than neighboring Pripyat). While living anywhere within the Chernobyl Exclusion Zone is technically illegal today, authorities tolerate those who choose to live within some of the less irradiated areas, and around 1,000 people live in Pripyat today.

First mentioned as a ducal hunting lodge in 1193, the city has changed hands multiple times over the course of history. Jews moved into the city in the 16th century, and a now-defunct monastery was established in the area in 1626. By the end of the 18th century, Chernobyl was a major centre of Hasidic Judaism under the Twersky Dynasty, who left Chernobyl after the city was subject to pogroms in the early 20th century. The Jewish community was later murdered during the Holocaust. Chernobyl was evacuated on 5 May 1986, nine days after a catastrophic nuclear disaster at the plant, which was the largest nuclear disaster in history. Along with the residents of the nearby city of Pripyat, which was built as a home for the plant's workers, the population was relocated to the newly built city of Slavutych, and most have never returned.

The city was the administrative centre of Chernobyl Raion (district) from 1923. After the disaster, in 1988, the raion was dissolved and administration was transferred to the neighbouring Ivankiv Raion. The raion was abolished on 18 July 2020 as part of the administrative reform of Ukraine, which reduced the number of raions of Kyiv Oblast to seven. The area of Ivankiv Raion was merged into Vyshhorod Raion.

Although Chernobyl is primarily a ghost town today, a small number of people still live there, in houses marked with signs that read, "Owner of this house lives here", and a small number of animals live there as well. Workers on watch and administrative personnel of the Chernobyl Exclusion Zone are also stationed in the city. The city has two general stores and a hotel.

During the 2022 Russian invasion of Ukraine, Chernobyl became the site of the Battle of Chernobyl and Russian forces occupied the city between 24 February and 2 April. After its capture, it was reported that radiation levels began rising.

Etymology

The city's name is the same as one of the Ukrainian names for Artemisia vulgaris, mugwort or common wormwood:  (or more commonly  , 'common artemisia').

The name in languages used nearby is:
, 
, 
, .

The name in languages formerly used in the area is:
, 
, .
In English, the Russian-derived spelling Chernobyl has been commonly used, but some style guides recommend the spelling Chornobyl, or the use of romanized Ukrainian names for Ukrainian places generally.

History

The Polish Geographical Dictionary of the Kingdom of Poland of 1880–1902 states that the time the city was founded is not known.

Identity of Ptolemy's "Azagarium"
Some older geographical dictionaries and descriptions of modern Eastern Europe mention "Czernobol" (Chernobyl) with reference to Ptolemy's world map (2nd century AD). Czernobol is identified as Azagarium [uk], "oppidium Sarmatiae" (Lat., "a city in Sarmatia"), by the 1605 Lexicon geographicum of Filippo Ferrari and the 1677 Lexicon Universale of Johann Jakob Hofmann. According to the Dictionary of Ancient Geography of Alexander Macbean (London, 1773), Azagarium is "a town of Sarmatia Europaea, on the Borysthenes" (Dnieper), 36° East longitude and 50°40' latitude. The city is "now supposed to be Czernobol, a town of Poland, in Red Russia [Red Ruthenia], in the Palatinate of Kiow [see Kiev Voivodeship], not far from the Borysthenes."

Whether Azagarium is indeed Czernobol is debatable. The question of Azagarium's correct location was raised in 1842 by Habsburg-Slovak historian, Pavel Jozef Šafárik, who published a book titled "Slavic Ancient History" ("Sławiańskie starożytności"), where he claimed Azagarium to be the hill of Zaguryna, which he found on an old Russian map "Bolzoj czertez" (Big drawing) near the city of Pereiaslav, now in central Ukraine.

In 2019, Ukrainian architect Boris Yerofalov-Pylypchak published a book, Roman Kyiv or Castrum Azagarium at Kyiv-Podil.

12th to 18th century
The archaeological excavations that were conducted in 2005–2008 found a cultural layer from the 10–12th centuries AD, which predates the first documentary mention of Chernobyl.

Around the 12th century Chernobyl was part of the land of Kievan Rus′. The first known mention of the settlement as Chernobyl is from an 1193 charter, which describes it as a hunting lodge of Knyaz Rurik Rostislavich. In 1362 it was a crown village of the Grand Duchy of Lithuania. Around that time the town had own castle which was ruined at least on two occasions in 1473 and 1482. The Chernobyl castle was rebuilt in the first quarter of the 16th century being located nearby the settlement in a hard to reach area. With revival of the castle, Chernobyl became a county seat. In 1552 it accounted for 196 buildings with 1,372 residents, out of which over 1,160 were considered city dwellers. In the city were developing various crafts professions such as blacksmith, cooper among others. Near Chernobyl has been excavated bog iron, out of which was produced iron. The village was granted to Filon Kmita, a captain of the royal cavalry, as a fiefdom in 1566. Following the Union of Lublin, the province where Chernobyl is located was transferred to the Crown of the Kingdom of Poland in 1569. Under the Polish Crown, Chernobyl became a seat of eldership (starostwo). During that period Chernobyl was inhabited by Ukrainian peasants, some Polish people and a relatively large number of Jews. Jews were brought to Chernobyl by Filon Kmita, during the Polish campaign of colonization. The first mentioning of Jewish community in Chernobyl is in the 17th century. In 1600 in the city was built the first kosciol (Polish word for the Roman Catholic church). Local population was persecuted for holding Eastern Orthodox rite services. The traditionally Eastern Orthodox Ukrainian peasantry around the town were forcibly converted, by Poland, to the Ruthenian Uniate Church. In 1626, during the Counter-reformation, a Dominican church and monastery were founded by Lukasz Sapieha. A group of Old Catholics opposed the decrees of the Council of Trent. The Chernobyl residents actively supported the Khmelnytsky Uprising (1648–1657).

With the signing of the Truce of Andrusovo in 1667, Chernobyl was secured after the Sapieha family. Sometime in the 18th century, the place was passed on to the Chodkiewicz family. In the mid-18th century the area around Chernobyl was engulfed in a number of peasant riots, which caused Prince Riepnin to write from Warsaw to Major General Krechetnikov, requesting hussars to be sent from Kharkiv to deal with the uprising near Chernobyl in 1768. By the end of the 18th century, the town accounted for 2,865 residents and had 642 buildings.

18th century to Soviet times: demography and events
Following the Second Partition of Poland, in 1793 Chernobyl was annexed by the Russian Empire and became part of Radomyshl county (uezd) as a supernumerary town ("zashtatny gorod"). Many of the Uniate Church converts returned to Eastern Orthodoxy.

In 1832, following the failed Polish November Uprising, the Dominican monastery was sequestrated. The church of the Old Catholics was disbanded in 1852.

Until the end of the 19th century, Chernobyl was a privately owned city that belonged to the Chodkiewicz family. In 1896 they sold the city to the state, but until 1910 they owned a castle and a house in the city.

In the second half of the 18th century, Chernobyl became a major centre of Hasidic Judaism. The Chernobyl Hasidic dynasty had been founded by Rabbi Menachem Nachum Twersky. The Jewish population suffered greatly from pogroms in October 1905 and in March–April 1919; many Jews were killed or robbed at the instigation of the Russian nationalist Black Hundreds. When the Twersky Dynasty left Chernobyl in 1920, it ceased to exist as a center of Hasidism.

Chernobyl had a population of 10,800 in 1898, including 7,200 Jews. In the beginning of March 1918 Chernobyl was occupied in World War I by German forces (see Treaty of Brest-Litovsk).

Soviet times (1920–1991)
Ukrainians and Bolsheviks fought over the city in the ensuing Civil War. In the Polish–Soviet War of 1919–20, Chernobyl was taken first by the Polish Army and then by the cavalry of the Red Army. From 1921 onwards, it was officially incorporated into the Ukrainian SSR.

Between 1929 and 1933, Chernobyl suffered from killings during Stalin's collectivization campaign. It was also affected by the famine that resulted from Stalin's policies. The Polish and German community of Chernobyl was deported to Kazakhstan in 1936, during the Frontier Clearances.

During World War II, Chernobyl was occupied by the German Army from 25 August 1941 to 17 November 1943. The Jewish community was murdered during the Holocaust.

It was the origin of the Russian Woodpecker and was designed as part of an anti-ballistic missile early warning radar network.

The plant was built alongside Pripyat, an "atomograd" city founded on 4 February 1970 that was intended to serve the nuclear power plant. The decision to build the power plant was adopted by the Central Committee of the Communist Party of the Soviet Union and the Council of Ministers of the Soviet Union on recommendations of the State Planning Committee that the Ukrainian SSR be its location. It was the first nuclear power plant to be built in Ukraine.

Independent Ukraine (1991–present)

With the dissolution of the Soviet Union in 1991, Chernobyl remained part of Ukraine within the Chernobyl Exclusion Zone which Ukraine inherited from the Soviet Union.

Russian occupation (February–April 2022) 

During the 2022 Russian invasion of Ukraine, Chernobyl became the site of the Battle of Chernobyl and Russian forces captured the city on 24 February. After its capture, Ukrainian officials reported that the radiation levels started to rise due to recent military activity causing radioactive dust to ascend into the air. Hundreds of Russian soldiers were suffering from radiation poisoning after digging trenches in a contaminated area, and one died. On 31 March it was reported that Russian forces had left the exclusion zone. Ukrainian authorities reasserted control over the area on 2 April.

Chernobyl nuclear reactor disaster

On 26 April 1986, one of the reactors at the Chernobyl Nuclear Power Plant exploded after unsanctioned experiments on the reactor by plant operators were done improperly. The resulting loss of control was due to design flaws of the RBMK reactor, which made it unstable when operated at low power, and prone to thermal runaway where increases in temperature increase reactor power output.

Chernobyl city was evacuated nine days after the disaster. The level of contamination with caesium-137 was around 555 kBq/m2 (surface ground deposition in 1986).

Later analyses concluded that, even with very conservative estimates, relocation of the city (or of any area below 1500 kBq/m2) could not be justified on the grounds of radiological health.
This however does not account for the uncertainty in the first few days of the accident about further depositions and weather patterns.
Moreover, an earlier short-term evacuation could have averted more significant doses from short-lived isotope radiation (specifically iodine-131, which has a half-life of about eight days).
Estimates of health effects are a subject of some controversy, see Effects of the Chernobyl disaster.

In 1998, average caesium-137 doses from the accident (estimated at 1–2 mSv per year) did not exceed those from other sources of exposure. Current effective caesium-137 dose rates as of 2019 are 200–250 nSv/h, or roughly 1.7–2.2 mSv per year,
which is comparable to the worldwide average background radiation from natural sources.

The base of operations for the administration and monitoring of the Chernobyl Exclusion Zone was moved from Pripyat to Chernobyl. Chernobyl currently contains offices for the State Agency of Ukraine on the Exclusion Zone Management and accommodations for visitors. Apartment blocks have been repurposed as accommodations for employees of the State Agency. The length of time that workers may spend within the Chernobyl Exclusion Zone is restricted by regulations that have been implemented to limit radiation exposure. Today, visits are allowed to Chernobyl but limited by strict rules.

In 2003, the United Nations Development Programme launched a project, called the Chernobyl Recovery and Development Programme (CRDP), for the recovery of the affected areas. The main goal of the CRDP's activities is supporting the efforts of the Government of Ukraine to mitigate the long-term social, economic, and ecological consequences of the Chernobyl disaster.

The city has become overgrown and many types of animals live there. According to census information collected over an extended period of time, it is estimated that more mammals live there now than before the disaster.

Notably, Mikhail Gorbachev, the final leader of the Soviet Union, stated in respect to the Chernobyl disaster that, "More than anything else, (Chernobyl) opened the possibility of much greater freedom of expression, to the point that the (Soviet) system as we knew it could no longer continue."

People
Aaron Twersky of Chernobyl (1784–1871), rabbi
Aleksander Franciszek Chodkiewicz (1776–1838), Polish politician and lithographer
Alexander Krasnoshchyokov (1880–1937), politician
Andriy Smalko (1981–), football player
Arnold Lakhovsky (1880–1937), artist
Jan Mikołaj Chodkiewicz (1738–1781), Polish nobleman, father of Rozalia Lubomirska
Ekaterina Scherbachenko (1977–), opera singer
Grigory Irmovich Novak (1919–1980), Jewish Soviet weightlifter
Joshua ben Aaron Zeitlin (1823–1888), scholar and philanthropist
Markiyan Kamysh (1988–), novelist and son of a liquidator
Rozalia Lubomirska (1768–1794), Polish noblewoman guillotined during the French Revolution
Volodymyr Pravyk (1962–1986), firefighter and liquidator

Climate
Chernobyl has a humid continental climate (Dfb) with very warm, wet summers with cool nights and long, cold, and snowy winters.

See also
List of Chernobyl-related articles

References

External links

 State Agency of Ukraine on Exclusion Zone Management – official information on public works, zone status, visits, etc.
 Official radiation measurements – State Agency of Ukraine on Exclusion Zone Management. Online map.
 Chernobyl – History of Jewish Communities in Ukraine JewUa.org
 The Chernobyl Gallery

 
1193 establishments in Europe
12th-century establishments in Ukraine

Cities in Kyiv Oblast
Cities of district significance in Ukraine
Cossack Hetmanate
Environmental disaster ghost towns
Ghost towns in the Chernobyl Exclusion Zone
Holocaust locations in Ukraine
Radomyslsky Uyezd
Kiev Voivodeship
Historic Jewish communities in Poland
Jewish Ukrainian history
Rus' settlements
Shtetls